Roger Damory, Lord d'Amory, Baron d'Amory in Ireland, (d. bef. 14 March 1321/1322) was a nobleman and Constable of Corfe Castle.

He was the younger son of Sir Robert D'Amory, Knight, of Bucknell and Woodperry, Oxfordshire. Sir Roger also possessed in his own right the manors of Bletchington and Holton, Oxfordshire, Standon in Hertfordshire, Caythorpe in Lincolnshire, and Knaresborough and St. Briavels' Castles.

He fought at the Battle of Bannockburn where he provided "good services", following which he was granted the manors of Sandal, Yorkshire and Vauxhall, Surrey, in 1317.

He was summoned to parliament on 20 November 1317, and in the 11th (1318), 12th (1319), 13th (1320) and 14th (1321) years of the reign of King Edward II, whereby he is held to have become Lord d'Amory.

He had been a favourite of King Edward II of England until he was displaced by Hugh Despenser the Younger. D'Amory took an active part in the Despenser War in 1321–1322 and was one of the principals in this affair. He captured Gloucester, burnt Bridgnorth, was at the siege of Tickhill and the battle at Burton-on-Trent. As a result, his lands were confiscated and orders were issued for his arrest. Retreating before the King's forces, being either sick or wounded he was left behind at Tutbury Castle, Staffordshire, where he was captured on 11 March 1322 (1321/1322). He was quickly tried and condemned to death. It appears, however, that his illness beat the executioner as he died there "of illness" two days later, and was buried at St. Mary's, Ware, Hertfordshire.

He married shortly before 3 May 1317 Elizabeth de Clare, being her third husband. They had one child:

 Elizabeth d'Amory (died before her husband) who married John Bardolf, 3rd Lord Bardolf (1311–1363) and was mother to William 4th Lord Bardolf (1349–1386).

References

Bibliography
 Lodge, John, Keeper of the Rolls, &c., The Peerage of Ireland, Dublin, 1789, p. 124.
 Banks, Sir T.C., Bt., Baronia Anglica Concentrata; or Baronies in Fee, London, 1844, p. 176.
 
 Waters, Robert, BA., Barrister of the Inner Temple, Genealogical Memoirs of the Extinct Family of Chester of Chicheley &c., London, 1878, vol.1, p. 140.
 
 Weis, Fredk., Lewis, et al., The Magna Charta Sureties 1215, 5th edition, Baltimore, 2002, p. 49.
 Richardson, Douglas, Plantagenet Ancestry, Baltimore, Md., 2004, p. 167.

1320s deaths
13th-century English people
14th-century English people
Barons in the Peerage of England
British and English royal favourites
People from Oxfordshire
Year of birth unknown
People from Dorset